Naïm Matoug (born 12 April 2003) is a Dutch footballer who currently plays as a midfielder for Jong PSV.

International career
Born in the Netherlands, Matoug is of Algerian and Dutch descent. He is a youth international for the Netherlands.

Career statistics

Club

Notes

References

2003 births
Living people
Dutch footballers
Netherlands youth international footballers
Dutch people of Algerian descent
Association football midfielders
VVV-Venlo players
PSV Eindhoven players
Jong PSV players
Eerste Divisie players